Hilarographa bosavina is a species of moth of the family Tortricidae. It is found in Papua New Guinea.

The wingspan is about 19 mm. The ground colour of the forewings is dark yellow forming a broad postbasal fascia. The dorso-posterior fourth of the wing is orange, marbled with brown and the dorsal part of the termen is yellow. The hindwings are yellow orange, but dark brown on the peripheries and pale orange in the terminal area. The anal field is brownish.

Etymology
The specific epithet refers to the type locality.

References

Moths described in 2009
Hilarographini